Honeyville is an unincorporated community in Eden Township, LaGrange County, Indiana.

Geography

References

Unincorporated communities in LaGrange County, Indiana
Unincorporated communities in Indiana